This is a list of radio stations in the state of Nayarit, Mexico.

Defunct stations 

 XEPVI-AM 1280, Xalisco

Notes

References 

Nayarit